Triclonella is a genus of moths in the family Cosmopterigidae.

Species
Triclonella albicellata (Meyrick, 1931)
Triclonella aglaogramma Meyrick, 1931
Triclonella antidectis (Meyrick, 1914)
Triclonella bicoloripennis Hodges, 1962
Triclonella calyptrodes Meyrick, 1922
Triclonella chionozona Meyrick, 1931
Triclonella citrocarpa (Meyrick, 1931)
Triclonella cruciformis Meyrick, 1931
Triclonella determinatella (Zeller, 1873) (syn: Triclonella australisella (Chambers, 1875))
Triclonella diglypta Meyrick, 1931
Triclonella elliptica Meyrick, 1916
Triclonella etearcha Meyrick, 1920
Triclonella euzosta Walsingham, 1912
Triclonella iphicleia Meyrick, 1924
Triclonella mediocris (Walsingham, 1897)
Triclonella pergandeella Busck, 1901
Triclonella philantha Meyrick, 1920
Triclonella pictoria Meyrick, 1916
Triclonella platyxantha (Meyrick, 1909)
Triclonella sequella Busck, 1914
Triclonella trachyxyla Meyrick, 1920
Triclonella triargyra Meyrick, 1920
Triclonella turbinalis Meyrick, 1933
Triclonella umbrigera Meyrick, 1929
Triclonella xanthota Walsingham, 1912
Triclonella xuthocelis Hodges, 1962

Selected former species
Triclonella anachasta Meyrick, 1928

References
Natural History Museum Lepidoptera genus database

Cosmopteriginae
Moth genera